The 2005–06 season was the 86th season in the existence of Hamburger SV and the club's 43rd consecutive season in the top flight of German football. In addition to the domestic league, Hamburger SV participated in this season's edition of the DFB-Pokal and the UEFA Cup. The season covered the period from 1 July 2005 to 30 June 2006.

Transfers

In

Out

Players

First-team squad
Squad at end of season

Left club during season

Hamburger SV II

Competitions

Overall record

Bundesliga

League table

Results summary

Results by round

Matches

DFB-Pokal

UEFA Cup

First round

Group stage

Statistics

Goalscorers

Notes

References

Hamburger SV seasons
Hamburger SV